Kona Brewing Hawai'i is a brewery in Kailua-Kona on Hawaii's Big Island. Formerly owned by Craft Brew Alliance, Kona is now owned by PV Brewing Partners since September 2020. Kona Brewing Company distributes its beers in 36 states and 10 different countries. Approximately 10 other styles of beer are brewed on a regular basis and served at Kona Brewing Company’s pubs, with a few being served in other restaurants all over the islands.

Company history
Kona Brewing Company was founded in the spring of 1994 by Cameron Healy and Spoon Khalsa. Kona Brewing Company's Kailua-Kona Pub on Hawaii's Big Island opened in November 1998. "A mahogany log lifted from the shores of Kailua Bay (used to adorn the acacia koa wood bar) and rusty corrugated tin from an old distillery helped transform the ink-smudged press room into little hops flavored oasis," said Kona president Mattson Davis in an interview with the Honolulu Star Bulletin in 2004. 

In 2003, Kona Brewing Co. opened its second restaurant at the Koko Marina Center in Hawaii Kai on Oahu.

In July 2008, Kona Brewing Company opened its third restaurant location and first franchise at Honolulu International Airport. Located at the mainland terminal, the restaurant features both Kona Brewing Company's brews and pub menu items.

In February 2010, Kona Brewing Company hired the largest Hawaii-owned and operated commercial solar energy contractor, to install a 229 kW solar energy generating system at its Kailua-Kona brewery and pub, which was expected to be fully operational by April 2010. The project, a roof mounted, grid tied photovoltaic (PV) system, is estimated to produce a daily average of 900 kWh of electricity, which will allow Kona Brewing Company nearly 60 percent offset of its current electricity usage. The brewery held a private blessing of the system with Sunetric on Monday, October 18 led by Hawaiian cultural educator Kumu Keala Ching as its solar system became fully operational.

On February 14, 2022, Kona Brewing Company opened a 30,000 square-foot manufacturing facility in Kailua-Kona.  Plans for the facility began in 2015, and Kona officially broke ground on the facility in 2016.

Year-round beer offerings 
Year-round beers 
 Longboard Island Lager
 Big Wave Golden Ale
 Castaway IPA
 Fire Rock Pale Ale
 Kona Light Blonde Ale
 Gold Cliff IPA
 Hanalei Island IPA
 Starfruit Orange IPA

Island-only beers

 Island Colada Wheat Ale
 Mai Time Wheat Ale
 Hibiscus Brut IPA

Breweries and sourcing
In 2012, Kona Brewing Company produced  of beer from its Kona brewery and other production facilities on the mainland. Kona Brewing Company runs its flagship brewery in Kailua-Kona on Hawaii's Big Island. Kona Brewing Company brands were also produced at Widmer Brothers Brewery in Portland, Oregon, and Redhook Ale Brewery in both Woodinville, Washington, and Portsmouth, New Hampshire, the sister subsidiaries of Craft Brew Alliance, Inc. Ownership by Craft Brew Alliance granted the company access to the Anheuser-Busch distribution network, which, according to Hawaii Business Magazine, "has the most technologically sophisticated distributor system in the country, with computer terminals in thousands of independently owned distributors and its own network of wholly owned distribution branches."

Recipes and beer specifications are dictated by Kona Brewing Company's brewmaster, who oversees all production at each Kona Brewing Company's partner breweries. The beer brewed at Kona Brewing Company's partner breweries utilizes Kona's hops, malt, and proprietary yeast. In order to create a consistent experience across the board, the water mineral levels at each brewery are adjusted to replicate the water used in Hawaii. First the water is treated for impurities and then minerals are added to mimic the fresh water available in Hawaii. Water is an important aspect of all Kona Brewing Company's beers. A sample of every batch of beer is sent to the Kona, Hawaii brewery and corporate offices for sensory evaluation.

Hawaii roots
Kona Brewing Company has three restaurants in Hawaii with 250 employees working on the islands in the brewery, restaurants, and in the corporate offices.

 Rift Zone Indigenous Red Ale is brewed using yeast cultivated and found only on the volcano rifts from the Big Island.
 Pipeline Porter is brewed with 100% Kona coffee from their neighbor on the Big Island, Cornwell Estate
 The ginger in their Big Island Ginger is cultivated in Kona.
 The lemongrass in the Lemongrass Ginger Luau is grown on-site and at employees' houses.
 Cacao nibs for specialty beers are sourced from Original Hawaiian Chocolate Factory.

Key people
 Mattson Davis, president

Growth and distribution
In 2009, Kona Brewing Company was ranked #14 in sales of all craft brewers in the US (approximately 1,450) according to the Brewers Association. Kona's beers are available in the United States in 25 states and the District of Columbia.

Longboard Island Lager, Big Wave Golden Ale, and Fire Rock Pale Ale are available all year. Wailua Ale and Pipeline Porter are limited releases of the Aloha Series, available for six months each in bars and grocery stores and specialty beer shops. Wailua Wheat Ale is available March through August and Pipeline Porter is available September through February. The company launched its third Aloha Series beer Koko Brown Ale to the West Coast in February 2011.

Caps, labels and advertising
The collectible caps of Kona beers all have Hawaiian words partnered with their English definitions. There are now 50 words in the collection.

All labels depict actual beaches and island scenes in Hawaii, such as Longboard Island Lager showing Honolulu's Waikiki Beach on Oahu. The crater in the background is Diamond Head. The label shows "surfers backed by Hawaii's volcanic mountains ride blue, blue waves toward a broad and sandy beach. The logo itself echoes a tribal tattoo, adding to the local vibe." In the late 2010s, the company produced television commercials through its "Bruddahs" campaign with actors Dave Bell and Brutus La Benz, who play friends making observations about "mainlanders" while discussing Kona beers.

Sustainability and community support
Kona Brewing Company supports numerous community events throughout the year, including surf and surf-inspired events and causes that celebrate Hawaiian people, land and water. These include sponsoring professional surfers Jeff Silva and CJ Kanuha. Kona supports Sierra Club's Blue Water Campaign and a number of chapters of Surfrider Foundation, including the Pacific NW and Hawaii's Surfrider Kona Kai Ea Chapter.

Kona brings the Sno-Kona Pond Skim to Mt. Hood Meadows, Oregon, each spring where costumed skiers and snowboarders skim across an icy pond. The athletes are competing for a number of prizes, among them a trip to Hawaii. Kona Brewing is also a sponsor of Portland's Backyard Bang, a snowboarding rail jam event in the streets of Portland's Pearl District, and the Art Institute of Portland. Kona also sponsored the 15-city North American tour for Lost Prophets – Search for the Collective in 2009.

As of January 2008, Kona has had a sustainability coordinator in place. Also, according to the Big Island Visitor's Bureau sustainable tourism practices section, "Kona's restaurant was constructed with recycled materials and adorned with native woods; local produce, fresh-caught fish and sustainably-raised beef on menu. Heat reclamation systems in the brewery greatly reduce energy demand; plastic, paper, metal, glass, and cardboard are recycled, takeout containers are made of plant-based materials and automatic faucets and toilets reduce water usage."

Controversy
In March 2017, Kona Brewing Company faced a class-action lawsuit on the claim of whether its beer was actually brewed in Hawaii or not.  The case was settled to compensate purchasers of Kona Beer between February 28, 2013, and June 14, 2019, up to $20 each (with receipts) or $10 each (without receipts).

Gallery

See also
List of breweries in Hawaii

References

External links

Hawaiian cuisine
Companies based in Hawaii
Beer brewing companies based in Hawaii
1994 establishments in Hawaii
Food and drink companies established in 1994
American companies established in 1994